"Smooth" is a song performed by American rock band Santana and Rob Thomas of Matchbox Twenty, who sings the lead vocals. It was released on June 15, 1999, as the lead single from Santana's 1999 studio album, Supernatural. It was written by Itaal Shur and Thomas, who re-wrote Shur's original melody and lyrics, and produced by Matt Serletic.

The song was an international success, reaching number one on the US Billboard Hot 100 for 12 consecutive weeks. It was the final number-one hit of the 1990s and the first number-one hit of the 2000s, and the only song to appear on two decade-end Billboard charts. "Smooth" is ranked as the third-most-successful song ever on Billboard's Greatest of All Time Hot 100 Songs listing. In 2000, the song won a Grammy Award for Record of the Year, Song of the Year, and Best Pop Collaboration with Vocals. "Smooth" also peaked at number one in Canada and charted within the top 10 in Australia, Austria, Ireland, and the United Kingdom.

Concept and background
"Smooth" was originally conceived by Itaal Shur as a song called "Room 17". The lyrics were stripped off and the track was given to Rob Thomas, who re-wrote the lyrics and melody and re-titled it "Smooth", then recorded the song as a demo to play for Santana. After hearing the song, Santana decided to have Thomas record the final version. Matt Serletic (who produced Matchbox Twenty's debut album Yourself or Someone Like You) produced the song, and it was released from Santana's album Supernatural. Thomas originally had George Michael in mind to sing the song.

Chart performance
By June 1, "Smooth" was leaked and played by some radio stations before its official release. The single became a chart-topping hit in 1999, spending 12 consecutive weeks at number one on the Billboard Hot 100 beginning with the week of October 23, 1999. It was the first chart-topping song in Carlos Santana's long-running career, rising higher than Santana's previous biggest hit, "Black Magic Woman", which peaked at number four in 1971. "Smooth" stayed in the top 10 of the Billboard Hot 100 for 30 weeks and the top 100 for 58 weeks.

In the United Kingdom, "Smooth" first charted at number 75 on the UK Singles Chart in October 1999. After a full release on March 20, 2000, it peaked at number three, spending eight weeks in the top 40. The song also peaked at number three in Ireland in March 2000, spending ten weeks on the Irish Singles Chart. It remains Santana's highest-charting single in both the UK and Ireland. The song also peaked at number one in Canada for a week, number two in Greece, number four in Australia, and number nine in Austria. It reached the top 40 in an additional seven countries: Belgium, Finland, France, Germany, the Netherlands, New Zealand, and Switzerland.

Legacy
On Billboard magazine's rankings of the top songs of the first 50 years of the Billboard Hot 100 singles chart, "Smooth" was ranked as the number-two song overall and the number-one rock song in the history of the chart.

In the 21st century, particularly during the summer of 2016, the song became the subject of several internet memes. Writing for MTV.com, Sasha Geffen compared the situation to similar resurgences of "All Star" by Smash Mouth and "One Week" by the Barenaked Ladies, going on to attribute the song's popularity to "the merits of its vocal absurdity." They wrote, "There's something ridiculous about how eagerly Rob Thomas lays his earnest alt-rock croon over Santana's guitar, sweating out lines about how his 'Spanish Harlem Mona Lisa' is 'just like the ocean under the moon' without a hint of self-consciousness or irony". In 2017, Tanya Sichynsky of The Washington Post similarly opined that, "The opening lyric 'Man, it's a hot one,'... is a punch line that requires no set-up."

Track listings

US CD and cassette single
 "Smooth" – 3:55
 "El farol" – 4:59

UK 1999 CD single
 "Smooth" – 3:55
 "Smooth" (instrumental) – 4:55
 "El farol" – 4:59

UK 2000 CD and cassette single
 "Smooth" (radio edit) – 3:55
 "Smooth" (dance radio mix) – 4:55
 "Smooth" (instrumental) – 4:55

European CD single
 "Smooth" (radio edit) – 3:55
 "Smooth" (album version) – 4:55

Australian CD single
 "Smooth" (radio edit) – 3:55
 "Smooth" (album version) – 4:55
 "Smooth" (instrumental) – 4:55

Credits and personnel
Credits are taken from the Supernatural album booklet.

Studios
 Recorded at Fantasy Studios (Berkeley, California)
 Mixed at the Record Plant (New York City)
 Mastered at A&M Mastering Studios (Los Angeles, California)

Personnel

 Itaal Shur – music, lyrics
 Rob Thomas – lyrics, lead vocals
 Carlos Santana – lead guitar
 Benny Rietveld – bass
 Chester Thompson – keyboards
 Rodney Holmes – drums
 Raul Rekow – congas
 Karl Perazzo – percussion
 Jeff Cressman – trombone

 José Abel Figueroa – trombone
 Javier Melendez – trumpet
 William Ortiz – trumpet
 Matt Serletic – production
 David Thoener – recording, mixing
 Steve Fontano – recording assistant
 Andy Haller – mixing assistant
 Mark Dobson – programming and digital editing
 Stephen Marcussen – mastering

Charts

Weekly charts

Year-end charts

Decade-end charts

Certifications

Release history

Cover versions

 A cover version of the song is included in the Nintendo Wii version of Samba de Amigo.
 Post-hardcore group Escape the Fate also recorded a cover version of the song for the compilation album Punk Goes Pop 2, released on March 10, 2009.
 Junior Lima from Brazilian pop duo Sandy & Junior sung a cover version of the song for the duo's live album/DVD As Quatro Estações - O Show, released in 2000.
 The song was featured on two tracks, "Melt Everyone" and "Smooth Flow", from Neil Cicierega's 2014 mash-up album Mouth Sounds, and on two tracks, "Smooth" and "Shit", from the 2017 follow-up album Mouth Moods.
 An acoustic version of the song was released by indie-folk artist Kimberly June on album Covers from Another, recorded at Round Hill Studios in Nashville in 2021.
 The song "Albi Ekhatark (قلبي اختارك)" by Egyptian singer Amr Diab is loosely based on "Smooth".

In popular culture

 In February 2013, The Onion published a satirical video joking that "Smooth" had swept the Grammy Awards for 13 years in a row.
 Singer Miley Cyrus - as her television alter ego Hannah Montana - made reference to "Smooth" and Carlos Santana in her song "Gonna Get This."
Funny or Die released a police drama parody trailer with Rob Thomas that recited the song's lyrics.
In 2019, comedian JP Leonard released a bit inspired by the song which puts Rob Thomas in various jobs. The track, "Man, It's a Hot One", appeared on the comedy album NO Show Comedy: A Louisiana Album Recording.
 In 2021, Santana would team up once again with Rob Thomas for a sequel of sorts called Move, off their latest album Blessings and Miracles. The song also features American Authors, and like Supernatural, the album is also packed with guests, something that has characterized most Santana albums since 1999.

See also
 List of Billboard Hot 100 number-one singles of 1999
 List of Billboard Hot 100 number-one singles of 2000
 List of RPM number-one singles of 1999
 List of RPM Rock/Alternative number-one singles (Canada)

References

External links
 "Smooth" on AllMusic

1999 debut singles
1999 songs
2000 singles
Arista Records singles
Billboard Hot 100 number-one singles
Carlos Santana songs
Grammy Award for Best Pop Collaboration with Vocals
Grammy Award for Record of the Year
Grammy Award for Song of the Year
Internet memes introduced in 2016
Music videos directed by Marcus Raboy
Rob Thomas (musician) songs
RPM Top Singles number-one singles
Santana (band) songs
Songs written by Rob Thomas (musician)
Songs written by Itaal Shur